Team 23 is an American basketball team that competes in The Basketball Tournament (TBT), an annual winner-take-all competition. The team has competed in each tournament since 2015, except for 2020. , the team's general manager is Rutgers alumnus Michael Illiano, and the head coach is Marc Hughes, who previously coached Overseas Elite. Team 23 was the tournament runner-up in 2015 and 2021.

History 
The team is named after Michael Jordan's primary uniform number during his professional career—Team 23's general manager Michael Illiano wrote that his "basketball passion started with MJ".

2015
After being accepted into TBT 2015 with 165 registered fans, Team 23 opened its tournament run by defeating the West Coast Ronin, 91–67. The team notched another win in the second round, against Richard Roby and Team Colorado, behind 28 points from Davin White, by a score of 78–72. White was effective once more as Team 23 bested Team B-Ball Breakdown in the following game, 86–72, pushing them to the Super 17 round in Chicago.

At the Super 17, Team 23 defeated 7outz, 105–64, in their first game, allowing only two of their opponents' players to score over 10 points. Team 23 made the semifinal round of the tournament after they won their fifth straight game by double figures. The losing team, LA Unified, missed one of their players, Ekene Ibekwe, and allowed Team 23 to score 11 straight points to begin the second half, en route to a 77–56 win.

Team 23 entered the semifinals as the most efficient team of the tournament. In New York City on August 1, they defeated Ants Alumni, 87–76, to advance to the championship game. In the finals on August 2, Team 23 narrowly fell to Overseas Elite, 67–65.

2016–2019
In TBT 2016, Team 23 was the top seed in the West Region, played in Los Angeles. After winning their first two games, they fell to Team Colorado, the eventual tournament runner-up, by a score of 78–73.

In TBT 2017, Team 23 was the fifth seed in the West Region, played in Las Vegas. They defeated 12th-seeded Pedro's Posse, 107–92, then lost to fourth-seeded Armored Athlete, 84–77.

In TBT 2018, Team 23 was the eighth seed in the West Region, played in Los Angeles. They lost in the first round to the ninth-seeded CitiTeam Blazers, 82–71.

In TBT 2019, Team 23 was the sixth seed in the Greensboro Regional. They lost in the first round to third-seeded Power of the Paw (Clemson alumni), 82–78.

The team did not compete in the reduced-size (24 teams) TBT 2020.

2021
In TBT 2021, Team 23 was seeded sixth in the West Virginia Regional. They defeated Georgia Kingz in the first round, 91–64, Herd That in the second round, 74–71, and second-seeded Best Virginia in the regional semifinals, 75–67.

Team 23 next faced top-seeded Sideline Cancer in the regional final, registering a 78–71 win. Team 23 then met Blue Collar U—who advanced from the Columbus Regional—in a tournament semifinal game on August 1; Team 23 won, 78–62.

Team 23 met Boeheim's Army—who advanced from the Illinois Regional—in the championship game on August 78th; the game was won by Boeheim's Army, 69–67.

Record by years

Awards
All-Tournament teams have been named since 2016; MVPs since 2014.

Logo and uniforms

Roster

References

External links 
Official team page

TBT Flashback - 2015 Championship Game via YouTube

Basketball teams in the United States
The Basketball Tournament teams
Basketball teams established in 2015
Basketball teams in Arizona